Parisada Hindu Dharma Indonesia (Indonesian Hindu Dharma Society) is a major reform movement and organization that assisted in the revival of Hinduism in Indonesia. It was started in 1959 by Ida Bagus Mantra and led by Gedong Bagus Oka.

Creation
It lobbied for the rights of Hindus in Bali after Hinduism became a state sponsored religion (along with Buddhism, Islam, Protestantism, and Catholicism) in 1959. From 1960–64 it was known as Parisada Hindu Dharma Bali. In 1964 however it began to stress a religious rather than regional character and changed its name to Parisada Hindu Dharma Indonesia

Religious Efforts
It sent out many Balinese missionaries to outlying areas like Medan. In 1992, the Parisada hosted the Vishva Hindu Parishad conference in Bali, indicating a building of bridges with the worldwide Hindu community.

In Politics
It is the highest religious body in Bali and is given an official sanction by the government to look into matters of Hindu law. The PHDI in this manner has become a rallying organization for the preservation of Hindu customs.

The PHD has contested Indonesia's demographic counts, saying that the 6,501,680 count (given by the government of Indonesia) grossly undercounts the Hindu population, stating that it is closer to 18 million.

On Law
The Parisada has lobbied for building restrictions near temples and places of worship in Bali.

Major Figures
Gedong Bagus Oka – Founder
Ketut Wiana – Balinese religious figure
Putu Alit Bagiasna - Balinese religion figure
Putu Sukreta Suranta – Indonesian lieutenant general – former heads of PHDI

References

External links
Between Adat and Agama – Kyoto University
The Sukarno years: 1950 to 1965 – Sejarah Indonesia
Balinese Hinduism – A Life of Ritual and Devotion – Hindu Vivek Kendra
Balinese Hindu Dharma – Part −02 – Shastras
Great Expectations: Hindu Revival Movements in Java, Indonesia – Swaveda.org
Official Site – Parisada Hindu Dharma Indonesia

Hindu organizations based in Indonesia
Religious organizations established in 1959
1959 establishments in Indonesia